Ghirardi is a surname. It may refer to:

Giovanni Battista Pinello di Ghirardi (c. 1544-1587), Italian music composer and Kapellmeister of the Italian Renaissance
Giancarlo Ghirardi (1935–2018), Italian physicist and emeritus professor of theoretical physics
Lea Ghirardi (born 1974), French tennis player 
Tommaso Ghirardi (born 1975), Italian businessman in the mechanics industry. Also known for having served as chairman (of BoD) and owner of Italian association football club Parma F.C. from January 2007 to December 2014.

See also
Ghirardi–Rimini–Weber theory (GRW; also known as spontaneous collapse theory), a collapse theory in quantum mechanics
Orto Botanico "G.E. Ghirardi", aka Giardino Botanico sperimentale "E. Ghirardi" and the Orto botanico di Toscolano Maderno, a botanical garden operated by the University of Milan, and located on Via Religione, Toscolano-Maderno on the western shore of Lake Garda, Province of Brescia, Lombardy, Italy.
Nature Reserve of Ghirardi, nature reserve located in the Province of Parma, Emilia-Romagna, Italy
Gherardi
 Gilardi
 Ghilardi